Ecaterina Sergeyevna Visnevscaia or Ekaterina Vishnevskaya (born 27 November 1999) is a Russian-Moldovan tennis player. She represented Russia from 2016 to 2021, until she gained Moldovan citizenship in 2022.

Visnevscaia has won one singles title and four doubles titles on the ITF Women's Circuit. On 22 October 2018, she reached her best singles ranking of world No. 523. On 1 October 2018, she peaked at No. 477 in the doubles rankings.

Visnevscaia made her Fed Cup debut for Moldova in 2022.

ITF Circuit finals

Singles: 3 (1 title, 2 runner-ups)

Doubles: 8 (4 titles, 4 runner–ups)

Fed Cup participation

Doubles (1–0)

References

External links
 
 
 

1999 births
Living people
Russian female tennis players
Moldovan female tennis players
Moldovan people of Russian descent
Naturalised citizens of Moldova